Indie Memphis, located in Memphis, TN, is an arts organization that runs year-round programs that "inspire, encourage and promote independent films and filmmaking in Memphis."

Film festival
The organization is mainly known for its yearly film festival that takes place in Memphis. The festival, which typically occurs in November, was nationally ranked as one of the "25 Coolest Film Festivals" by MovieMaker magazine. The festival attracts filmmakers and musicians from across the nation during its weekend long run. The 2012 festival took place November 1–4, 2012.

Notable other programs
The Indie Memphis Concert Film Series, free summertime screenings of various concert films at the Levitt Shell, a local open air auditorium located in Overton Park
Global Lens Film Series, a film program that showcases narrative films from across the world

Awards 

2013 Awards
 Best Narrative Feature: It Felt Like Love
 Duncan-Williams Scriptwriting Award: See You Next Tuesday
 Special Jury Award for outstanding performance: Eleanor Pienta (See You Next Tuesday)
 Special Jury Award - The Emerging Artist Award for the creative promise shown by their debut feature "What I Love About Concrete," directed by Katherine Dohan & Alanna Stewart
 Best Documentary Feature: "Brothers Hypnotic"
 Special Jury Award: Great Chicken Wing Hunt
 Southern Soul of Independent Film Award: "Orange Mound, Tennessee: America's Community"
 Ron Tibbett Excellence in Filmmaking Award: Bob Birdnow's Remarkable Tale of Human Survival and the Transcendence of Self
 Craig Brewer Emerging Filmmaker Award: "Escape from Tomorrow"

2012 Awards
Narrative Feature Awards:
 Best Narrative Feature: Red Flag
 Duncan-Williams Scriptwriting Award: Redlegs
 Nice Shoes Award:  Sun Don't Shine
 Special Features Jury Award for Cinematography: Pavilion
Audience Award for Best Narrative Feature: Quartet

Documentary Awards:
 Best Documentary Feature: Big Star: Nothing Can Hurt Me
 Special Jury Prize for Documentary Feature: Very Extremely Dangerous
 Best Documentary Short: Mr. Smith's Peach Seeds
 Special Jury Prize for Documentary Short: Abuelas
 Audience Award for Documentary Feature: Antenna
 Audience Award for Documentary Short: Cardboard Titanics

Short Films Awards:

 Best Short Film: Throat Song
 Best Animated/Experimental Film: The Hunter
 Special Jury Prize for Cinematography: Suspended
 Special Jury Prize for Outstanding Performance: Robert Longstreet (for Cork's Cattlebaron and What Happens When Robert Leaves the Room)
 Audience Award for Narrative Short: Morning Stroll

Hometowner Awards:

 Best Hometowner Feature: Open Five 2
 Best Hometowner Narrative Short: Pretty Monsters
 Honorable Mention for Best Hometowner Narrative Short: Twine Sleep
 Best Hometowner Documentary Short: As I Am
 Audience Award for Hometowner Film: As I Am
 Special Jury Prize for Local Significance: Antenna

Festival Committee Awards:

 First Annual Indie Memphis Lifetime Achievement Award: Rod Pitts
 Soul of Southern Film Award: Pilgrim Song
 Ron Tibbett Excellence in Filmmaking Award: Reconvergence

2011 Awards
Narrative Feature Awards:
 Best Narrative Feature: A Little Closer
 Duncan-Williams Scriptwriting Award: The Dish and the Spoon
 Nice Shoes Award:  Without

Documentary Awards:
 Best Documentary Feature: Heaven+Earth+Joe Davis
 Special Jury Prize for Documentary Feature: This Is What Love In Action Looks Like

Hometowner Awards:

 Best Hometowner Feature: This Is What Love In Action Looks Like
 Best Hometowner Narrative Short: Fresh Sqweezed
 Audience Award for Hometowner Film: Fresh Sqweezed

Festival Committee Awards:

 Soul of Southern Film Award: Lord Byron
 Ron Tibbett Excellence in Filmmaking Award: Bad Fever

References

External links
Indie Memphis Official Site

Organizations based in Memphis, Tennessee
Film festivals in Tennessee
Culture of Memphis, Tennessee